Chin Sebili (also Romanized as Chīn Sebīlī and Chīn Sabīlī; also known as Chīn Sīblī, Chen Sebblī, and Chīn Sebablī) is a village in Mazraeh-ye Jonubi Rural District, Voshmgir District, Aqqala County, Golestan Province, Iran. At the 2006 census, its population was 3,336, in 767 families.

References 

Populated places in Aqqala County